{{Infobox football club season
|club=Tottenham Hotspur
|season=1989–90
|manager= Terry Venables
|chairman= Irving Scholar
|stadium=White Hart Lane
|league=First Division
|league result=3rd
|cup1=FA Cup
|cup1 result=Third-round'|cup2=League Cup
|cup2 result=Quarter-final
|league topscorer=Gary Lineker(24)
|season topscorer=Gary Lineker(26)
|highest attendance=
|lowest attendance=
|average attendance= 
|pattern_b1=_bluestriped_sides|pattern_sh1=_whitesides|pattern_so1=_navytop|shorts1=003366|pattern_b2=_|leftarm2=ffd700|body2=ffd700|rightarm2=ffd700|shorts2=ffd700|socks2=ffd700
|prevseason=1988–89
|nextseason=1990–91
}}
The 1989–90 season was the 84th season of competitive football played by Tottenham Hotspur. Entering the 1989–90 season, Terry Venables stayed on as manager for his third season as charge of Tottenham with the team ending in third position, sixteen points behind eventual champions Liverpool. In the FA Cup, they got knocked by fellow first division team, Southampton and they got knocked out in the quarter-finals of the Football League Cup by Nottingham Forest.

Pre-season and friendlies

Football League First Division

ResultsTottenham Hotspur's score comes firstLegend

Football League First Division

Partial league table

FA Cup

As part of the first division, Tottenham automatically qualified through to the third round of the FA Cup where they was drawn to meet fellow first division side Southampton in their first match. In the match, Tottenham was dominated by the Southampton midfield in Jimmy Case, Glenn Cockerill and Barry Horne with Southampton getting a 3–1 victory despite a goal from David Howells giving Tottenham hope with twelve minutes to go.

Colour key: Green = Tottenham win; Yellow = draw; Red = opponents win. Tottenham score ordered first.

Football League Cup

As part of the first division, Tottenham started the League Cup in the second round where they were drawn to meet fourth division side, Southend United. Over two legs, Tottenham would only scrape through on away goals with David Lacey from The Guardian'' describing their defence as secure as a sandcastle on high tide after the first leg. Two weeks later, they played fellow first division club Manchester United in the third round. After losing Terry Fenwick early in the match, Tottenham won 3–0 with goals on either side of the break securing the victory.

Tottenham had another away game in the fourth round, this time to Prenton Park to take on third division side Tranmere Rovers. A goal from Paul Gascoigne an own goal from Dave Higgins sent the match into a replay at White Hart which Tottenham winning 4–0. The following round saw them visit City Ground, the home stadium of Nottingham Forest and saw them go two goals down before the half but goals from Gary Lineker and Steve Sedgley force the match into a replay at White Hart. Nayim scored the opening goal within the first minute before Nottingham scored the equalizer in the 36th minute before gaining the lead five minutes later. In the 64th minute, Tottenham equalized with Paul Walsh after coming of a David Howells kick. But two minutes later, Steve Hodge scored the match winner for Nottingham and knocking out Tottenham in the process.

Colour key: Green = Tottenham win; Yellow = draw; Red = opponents win. Tottenham score ordered first.

Statistics

Appearances and goals

{| class="wikitable" style="text-align:center"
|-
! rowspan="2" style="vertical-align:bottom;" | Pos.
! rowspan="2" style="vertical-align:bottom; width:240px" | Name
! colspan="2" style="width:85px;" | Premier League
! colspan="2" style="width:85px;" | FA Cup
! colspan="2" style="width:85px;" | EFL Cup
! colspan="2" style="width:85px;" | Total
|-
! Apps
! Goals
! Apps
! Goals
! Apps
! Goals
! Apps
! Goals
|-
| MF
| align="left" |  Paul Allen
|| 29+3 || 6 || 1 || 0 || 6 || 2 || 36+3 || 8
|-
| DF
| align="left" |  Guðni Bergsson
|| 17+1 || 0 || 1 || 0 || 1 || 0 || 19+1 || 0
|-
| DF
| align="left" |  Guy Butters
|| 7 || 0 || 0 || 0 || 1 || 0 || 8 || 0
|-
| DF
| align="left" |  Terry Fenwick
|| 10 || 0 || 0 || 0 || 3 || 1 || 13 || 1
|-
| MF
| align="left" |  Paul Gascoigne
|| 34 || 6 || 0 || 0 || 4 || 1 || 38 || 7
|-
| MF
| align="left" |  David Howells
|| 33+1 || 5 || 1 || 1 || 5+1 || 1 || 39+2 || 7
|-
| DF
| align="left" |  Chris Hughton
|| 8 || 0 || 1 || 0 || 0+1 || 0 || 9+1 || 0
|-
| FW
| align="left" |  Gary Lineker
|| 38 || 24 || 1 || 0 || 6 || 2 || 45 || 26
|-
| DF
| align="left" |  Gary Mabbutt
|| 36 || 0 || 1 || 0 || 7 || 1 || 44 || 1
|-
| GK
| align="left" |  Bobby Mimms
|| 4 || 0 || 1 || 0 || 0 || 0 || 5 || 0
|-
| MF
| align="left" |  John Moncur
|| 2+3 || 1 || 0 || 0 || 0 || 0 || 2+3 || 1
|-
| FW
| align="left" |  Paul Moran
|| 0+5 || 1 || 0 || 0 || 0+1 || 0 || 0+6 || 1
|-
| MF
| align="left" |  Nayim
|| 18+1 || 0 || 0 || 0 || 3+1 || 3 || 21+2 || 3
|-
| DF
| align="left" |  Andy Polston
|| 1 || 0 || 0 || 0 || 0 || 0 || 1 || 0
|-
| DF
| align="left" |  John Polston
|| 10+3 || 1 || 0 || 0 || 3 || 0 || 13+3 || 1
|-
| MF
| align="left" |  Mark Robson
|| 0+3 || 0 || 0 || 0 || 1 || 0 || 1+3 || 0
|-
| MF
| align="left" |  Vinny Samways
|| 18+5 || 3 || 1 || 0 || 4+1 || 1 || 23+6 || 4
|-
| MF
| align="left" |  Steve Sedgley
|| 31+1 || 0 || 1 || 0 || 6 || 1 || 38+1 || 1
|-
| DF
| align="left" |  Gary Stevens
|| 4+3 || 0 || 0 || 0 || 0+1 || 0 || 4+4 || 0
|-
| MF
| align="left" |  Paul Stewart
|| 25+3 || 8 || 1 || 0 || 6 || 1 || 32+3 || 9
|-
| DF
| align="left" |  Mitchell Thomas
|| 18+8 || 1 || 1 || 0 || 7 || 0 || 26+8 || 1
|-
| GK
| align="left" |  Erik Thorstvedt
|| 34 || 0 || 0 || 0 || 7 || 0 || 41 || 0
|-
| DF
| align="left" |  Pat Van Den Hauwe
|| 31 || 0 || 0 || 0 || 6 || 0 || 37 || 0
|-
| FW
| align="left" |  Paul Walsh
|| 12+14 || 2 || 0+1 || 0 || 1+3 || 1 || 13+18 || 3
|-

Goal scorers

Clean sheets

See also
 1989–90 in English football
 List of Tottenham Hotspur F.C. seasons

Notes

References

External links

Tottenham
Tottenham Hotspur F.C. seasons